The Hizb Rateb is a collective recitation of Quran or dhikr or dua or wird done by murids and saliks in islamic sufism.

Presentation 
The Hizb Rateb is a group tilawa of the Quran with one voice, in mosques, zawiyas, kuttabs and Quranic schools.

This custom has been practised in the Maghreb countries since the tenth hijri century under the Almohad Caliphate, after Sheikh  created the rules for collective reading with one tone.

It has an allocated and known times, because it may be recitated after the Fajr prayer or after the Maghrib prayer.

It may also be recitated before the Zuhr prayer or before the Asr prayer.

Thus, in the countries of the Maghreb, the muslims used to recite the Quran together in what is known as the Hizb Rateb, in line with the current custom in these states.

See also 
Hezzab
Bash Hezzab
Nass al-Houdhour
Salka
Tilawa
Idjaza
Sujud Tilawa

References 

Sufism
Spiritual practice
Warsh recitation
Language and mysticism
Arabic words and phrases
Islamic belief and doctrine
Islamic terminology
Islam in Algeria
Sufism in Algeria